Briggs may refer to:

People
 Briggs (surname)
 Briggs (rapper), Australian rapper

Places
In the United States
 Briggs, Nebraska, an unincorporated community
 Briggs, Ohio
 Briggs, Oklahoma
 Briggs, Texas
 Briggs, Virginia
 Briggs Lake, a lake in Minnesota

Elsewhere
 Briggs Islet, Tasmania, Australia
 Briggs Township, Ontario, Canada

In space
 Briggs (crater), a lunar crater
 4209 Briggs, an asteroid discovered in 1986

Other uses
 Briggs & Stratton, a manufacturer of air-cooled gasoline engines
 Briggs v. Elliott, one of the school segregation cases consolidated with Brown v. Board of Education
 Briggs Automotive Company or BAC, a car manufacturing company
 Briggs Initiative, either of two pieces of Californian legislation sponsored by John Briggs
 Briggs Manufacturing Company, manufacturer of car bodies for Ford and Chrysler
 The Briggs, a punk rock band
 Myers–Briggs Type Indicator